Suyeong Station is a station on the Busan Metro Line 2 and Line 3 located in U-dong, Suyeong District, Busan. The station is unrelated to the Centum station operated by Korail.

Gallery

External links
 Cyber station information, Line 2 from Busan Transportation Corporation 
 Cyber station information, Line 3 from Busan Transportation Corporation 

Railway stations opened in 2002
Railway stations opened in 2005
Busan Metro stations
Suyeong District
2002 establishments in South Korea